A raw audio file is any file containing un-containerized and uncompressed audio. The data is stored as raw pulse-code modulation (PCM) values without any metadata header information (such as sampling rate, bit depth, endian, or number of channels).

Extensions
Raw files can have a wide range of file extensions, common ones being .raw, .pcm, or .sam. They can also have no extension.

Playing
As there is no header, compatible audio players require information from the user that would normally be stored in a header, such as the encoding, sample rate, number of bits used per sample, and the number of channels.

References

Digital audio
Computer file formats